Trouble in Paradise is the second album released by New Zealand rock band, Elemeno P. A Deluxe edition was later released, featuring the single 2006 "S.O.S".

Track listing
"You Are"
"Pardon Me"
"Ohio"
"Burn"
"One Left Standing"
"11:57"
"Is This What We've Been Waiting For?"
"Death and the Maiden" (cover, written and originally performed by The Verlaines)
"The Day I Went Under"
"Life's Not Fair"
"Stay/Go"

Bonus Disc
S.O.S.
Stand Beside Me
One Left Standing (The Laid Back Mix)
Intro/11.57 (Live)
Every Day's A Saturday (Live)
You Are (Live)
One Left Standing (Live)
Sad For You
Trouble In Paradise

2005 albums
Elemeno P albums